Devakottai division is a revenue division in the Sivaganga district of Tamil Nadu, India.

References 
 

Sivaganga district